Sellar Property Group is a British property group notable for its project Shard London Bridge, built in London Borough of Southwark, United Kingdom.

It is headquartered at 42-44 Bermondsey Street, London. Sellar was previously headquartered in Park Street, Mayfair.

The company has teamed up with Renzo Piano and Great Western Developments on plans for Paddington Quarter, which is a £775m redevelopment of the former Royal Mail sorting office adjacent to Paddington Station.

References

Companies based in London
Companies based in the London Borough of Southwark